Marvin Monnie Sease (February 16, 1946 – February 8, 2011) was an American blues and soul singer-songwriter known for his gospel-infused vocal style and erotic lyrics.

Biography

Born in Blackville, South Carolina, Sease started as a gospel artist, joining a gospel group called the Five Gospel Crowns, located in Charleston, South Carolina. After singing with them, Sease then left at age 20 for New York City. At this young age settling into New York, he then joined another gospel group called the Gospel Crowns. Having a preference for the musical style of R&B, Sease left the gospel circuit to form his own R&B group. In this group Sease was accompanied by his own three brothers, and named the backing band Naglfar. This band did not find popularity and eventually broke up. He did not quit performing musically, but began to cover songs that started a career with a recurring gig at the Brooklyn club, Casablanca.

In 1986, he recorded a self-titled album, featuring one of his more popular songs, "Ghetto Man".  This started his professional career with his fans in the South's circuit of bars, blues festivals, and juke joints. While promoting his self produced and publicized debut album, he entered a recording contract with Polygram. With this contract, he was able to launch his music nationally with the re-release of his self-titled LP on Mercury Records in 1987. This updated release of his previous material also included the new ten-minute track "Candy Licker", which became an instant success for Sease through the South.
Success had finally come to Sease without the help of airplay, which deemed his sound too explicit for the audience. Sease's success with "Candy Licker" ensured a strong female-based following.  He was said to have a comparable sound to Johnnie Taylor and Tyrone Davis, but without the commercial success.

Over the next decade Sease released several more records for Mercury and Jive Records.  His only nationally charting hit, "Tonight", reached # 86 on the US Billboard R&B chart in 1991.

Sease died of complications from pneumonia in Vicksburg, Mississippi, on February 8, 2011, eight days before his 65th birthday.

There was a poster depicting Sease in the film, Pretty in Pink.

References

External links
An in-depth interview with Marvin Sease at Soul Express

1946 births
2011 deaths
People from Blackville, South Carolina
21st-century American singers
20th-century American singers
American blues singers
American soul singers
Deaths from pneumonia in Mississippi
20th-century American male singers
21st-century American male singers
Malaco Records artists